Lavasani (also Romanized as Lavāsānī; also known as Ḩājjī Shahbāz Khān) is a village in Qaleh Shahin Rural District, in the Central District of Sarpol-e Zahab County, Kermanshah Province, Iran. At the 2006 census, its population was 244, in 49 families.

References 

Populated places in Sarpol-e Zahab County